Zarechny is a town in Sverdlovsk Oblast, Russia, located on the Pyshma River east of Yekaterinburg. Population:

History
It was granted urban-type settlement status in 1957; town status was granted in 1992.

Administrative and municipal status
Within the framework of the administrative divisions, it is, together with four rural localities, incorporated as the Town of Zarechny—an administrative unit with the status equal to that of the districts. As a municipal division, the Town of Zarechny is incorporated as Zarechny Urban Okrug.

Economy
Zarechny is set in a forested region, and also is the site of the Beloyarsk nuclear power station. The site a 600 MW sodium-cooled fast breeder reactor. There are plans for an 800 MW reactor and there are two older reactors that have been decommissioned. There is also a 15 MW reactor used for research and collaboration with several international partners.
The power station is also connected to a number of cultural events, and hosted a folk festival in 2008. A Zarechny woman Tatiana Vdovina also came third in the Miss Atom 2008 beauty contest.

Zarechny is home of the martial arts club "Desantnik", which is based opposite the memorial to soldiers fallen in modern wars.

References

Notes

Sources

Cities and towns in Sverdlovsk Oblast
Naukograds